Philippine Airlines Flight 812 was a scheduled domestic passenger flight from Francisco Bangoy International Airport in Davao City to Ninoy Aquino International Airport near Manila. On May 25, 2000, an Airbus A330-301 operating on the route was hijacked by a man later identified as Reginald Chua, just before the airplane was about to land. The flight carried 278 passengers and 13 crew members.

Hijacking 
The hijacker had a gun and a hand grenade. He fired a gun into a bulkhead and demanded to be let into the cockpit. When access was refused, he then demanded the passengers place their valuables in a bag before he commanded the pilot to descend and depressurize the aircraft so that he could escape by a homemade parachute. Since it did not have a rip cord, one was made with a curtain sash on the aircraft. Before he was about to jump, he was not able to overcome the gust of wind from the plane's open rear door, and a flight attendant helped him jump out of the plane.

Officials initially identified him as "Augusto Lakandula", based on the name on his ticket. The pilot expressed skepticism that the hijacker would have survived the jump.

Police authorities stated that he died since he was unable to get his parachute to open. Through his driver's license, "Lakandula" was finally correctly identified as Reginald Chua, who had reportedly suffered financial difficulties.

In popular culture

The incident is referenced in the 2013 British film Metro Manila. The film's protagonist Oscar Ramirez (Jake Macapagal) tells the story of Alfred Santos, a textile factory owner who lost his father to a gang hired by a rival factory. Having forced to shut down his business due to continuous threats by his rival, Santos hijacked an airliner and ordered the passengers to surrender their money and valuables before jumping off the plane to his death.

References

External links
Philippine Airlines Flight 812 at Aviation Safety Network

Accidents and incidents involving the Airbus A330
Aircraft hijackings
Aviation accidents and incidents in the Philippines
Aviation accidents and incidents in 2000
812
Robberies in the Philippines
2000 crimes in the Philippines
2000 disasters in the Philippines
May 2000 events in the Philippines